Ken Kallaste (né Akerta; born 31 August 1988) is an Estonian professional footballer who plays as a left back for  Meistriliiga club Flora and the Estonia national team.

Club career

Flora
Kallaste came through the Flora youth system. He made his debut in the Meistriliiga playing for Flora affiliated Warrior on 12 March 2006, in a 0–6 away loss to Maag Tartu. In July 2006, Kallaste moved to Flora's first team. He made his debut for the club on 9 July 2006, in a 0–1 home loss to Levadia.

In July 2008, Kallaste joined Tulevik on loan until the end of the season.

Nõmme Kalju
On 6 January 2010, Kallaste signed a three-year contract with Nõmme Kalju. He made his debut for the club on 9 March 2010, in 1–0 home victory over Tulevik. Kallaste helped Nõmme Kalju win the Meistriliiga title in 2012. From 8 May 2010 to 20 July 2013, Kallaste played every single minute of 116 consecutive league matches, earning himself the nickname Raudmees (Iron Man).

Górnik Zabrze
On 22 December 2015, Kallaste signed for Polish club Górnik Zabrze on a one-and-a-half year deal, with an option to extend the contract for another year. He made his debut in the Ekstraklasa on 13 February 2016, in a 0–3 away loss to Cracovia. Górnik Zabrze were relegated at the end of the 2015–16 season and on 25 June 2016, Kallaste was released from his contract by mutual consent.

Korona Kielce
On 27 June 2016, Kallaste signed a two-year contract with Korona Kielce. He made his debut for the club on 17 August 2016, in a 0–4 away loss to Zagłębie Lubin. Kallaste scored his first Ekstraklasa goal on 25 November 2017, in a 3–2 home win over Legia Warsaw.

GKS Tychy
On 17 June 2019, Kallaste signed for I liga side GKS Tychy on a one-year deal, with an option to extend his contract for another year.

International career
Kallaste has represented Estonia at under-17, under-18, under-19, under-21 and under-23 levels.

On 1 November 2012, Kallaste was named in Estonia's squad for a friendly match against Oman on 8 November 2012, and made his senior international debut in the 2–1 away win.

Personal life
Kallaste was born Ken Akerta, but changed his last name to Kallaste in 2006. He is the son of former professional footballer and Estonian international Risto Kallaste.

Kallaste has a daughter (born 2012).

Career statistics

Club

International

Honours

Club
Flora
Estonian Cup: 2008–09
Estonian Supercup: 2009

Nõmme Kalju
Meistriliiga: 2012
Estonian Cup: 2014–15

References

External links

1988 births
Living people
Footballers from Tallinn
Estonian footballers
Association football defenders
Esiliiga players
JK Tervis Pärnu players
Meistriliiga players
FC Warrior Valga players
FC Flora players
Viljandi JK Tulevik players
Nõmme Kalju FC players
Ekstraklasa players
Górnik Zabrze players
Korona Kielce players
I liga players
GKS Tychy players
Estonia youth international footballers
Estonia under-21 international footballers
Estonia international footballers
Estonian expatriate footballers
Expatriate footballers in Poland
Estonian expatriate sportspeople in Poland